An oxide is a chemical compound containing at least one oxygen atom and one other element in its chemical formula. "Oxide" itself is the dianion (anion bearing a net charge of –2) of oxygen, an O2– ion with oxygen in the oxidation state of −2. Most of the Earth's crust consists of oxides. Even materials considered pure elements often develop an oxide coating.

Stoichiometry
Oxides are extraordinarily diverse in terms of stoichiometries (the measurable relationship between reactants and chemical equations of a equation or reaction)) and in terms of the structures of each stoichiometry. Most elements form oxides of more than one stoichiometry. A well known example is carbon monoxide and carbon dioxide. This applies to binary oxides, that is, compounds containing only oxide and another element.  Far more common than binary oxides are oxides of more complex stoichiometries.  Such complexity can arise by the introduction of other cations (a positively charged ion, i.e. one that would be attracted to the cathode in electrolysis) or other anions (a negatively charged ion). Iron silicate, Fe2SiO4, the mineral fayalite, is one of many examples of a ternary oxide. For many metal oxides, the possibilities of polymorphism and nonstoichiometry exist as well.  The commercially important dioxides of titanium exists in three distinct structures, for example.  Many metal oxides exist in various nonstoichiometric states.  Many molecular oxides exist with diverse ligands as well.

For simplicity sake, most of this article focuses on binary oxides.

Formation
Oxides are associated with all elements except a few noble gases. The pathways for the formation of this diverse family of compounds are correspondingly numerous.

Metal oxides
Many metal oxides arise by decomposition of other metal compounds, e.g. carbonates, hydroxides, and nitrates.  In the making of calcium oxide, calcium carbonate (limestone) breaks down upon heating, releasing carbon dioxide:
CaCO3  ->  CaO  +  CO2
The reaction of elements with oxygen in air is a key step in corrosion relevant to the commercial use of iron especially. Almost all elements form oxides upon heating with oxygen atmosphere. For example, zinc powder will burn in air to give zinc oxide:
2 Zn  + O2  ->  2 ZnO
The production of metals from ores often involves the production of oxides by roasting (heating) metal sulfide minerals in air. In this way,  (molybdenite) is converted to molybdenum trioxide, the precursor to virtually all molybdenum compounds:
2 MoS2  +  7 O2  ->  2MoO3  +  4 SO2

Noble metals (such as gold and platinum) are prized because they resist direct chemical combination with oxygen.
NiS  + 3/2 O2  ->  NiO  +  SO2

Non-metal oxides
Important and prevalent nonmetal oxides are carbon dioxide and carbon monoxide.  These species form upon full or partial oxidation of carbon or hydrocarbons.  With a deficiency of oxygen, the monoxide is produced:
CH4  + 3/2 O2  ->  CO  +  2 H2O
C  + 1/2 O2  ->  CO
With excess oxygen, the dioxide is the product, the pathway proceeds by the intermediacy of carbon monoxide:
CH4  + 2 O2  ->  CO2  +  2 H2O
C + O2  ->  CO2

Elemental nitrogen is difficult to convert to oxides, but the combustion of ammonia gives nitric oxide, which further reacts with oxygen:
4 NH3  + 5 O2  ->  4 NO  +  6 H2O
NO  + 1/2 O2  ->  NO2
These reactions are practiced in the production of nitric acid, a commodity chemical.

The chemical produced on the largest scale industrially is sulfuric acid.  It is produced by the oxidation of sulfur to sulfur dioxide, which is separately oxidized to sulfur trioxide: 
S + O2  -> SO2
SO2 + 1/2 O2  -> SO3
Finally the trioxide is converted to sulfuric acid by a hydration reaction:
SO3 + H2O  -> H2SO4

Structure
Oxides have a range of structures, from individual molecules to polymeric and crystalline structures.  At standard conditions, oxides may range from solids to gases. Solid oxides of metals usually have polymeric structures at ambient conditions.

Molecular oxides

Although most metal oxides are crystalline solids, some oxides are molecules.  Examples of molecular oxides are carbon dioxide and carbon monoxide. All simple oxides of nitrogen are molecular, e.g., NO, N2O, NO2 and N2O4. Phosphorus pentoxide is a more complex molecular oxide with a deceptive name, the real formula being P4O10. Tetroxides are rare, with a few more common examples being iridium tetroxide, ruthenium tetroxide, osmium tetroxide, and xenon tetroxide.

Reactions

Reduction

Reduction of metal oxide to the metal is practiced on a large scale in the production of some metals.  Many metal oxides convert to metals simply by heating, (see Thermal decomposition). For example, silver oxide decomposes at 200 °C:
 2 Ag2O -> 4 Ag + O2
Most often, however, metals oxides are reduced by a chemical reagent.  A common and cheap reducing agent is carbon in the form of coke.  The most prominent example is that of iron ore smelting. Many reactions are involved, but the simplified equation is usually shown as:
 2 Fe2O3 + 3 C -> 4 Fe + 3 CO2

Some metal oxides dissolve in the presence of reducing agents, which can include organic compounds.  Reductive dissolution of ferric oxides is integral to geochemical phenomena such as the iron cycle.

Hydrolysis and dissolution
Because the M-O bonds are typically strong, metal oxides tend to be insoluble in solvents, though they may be attacked by aqueous acids and bases.

Dissolution of oxides often gives oxyanions.  Adding aqueous base to  gives various phosphates.  Adding aqueous base to  gives polyoxometalates.  Oxycations are rarer, some examples being nitrosonium, vanadyl, and uranyl.  Of course many compounds are known with both oxides and other groups.  In organic chemistry, these include ketones and many related carbonyl compounds. For the transition metals, many oxo complexes are known as well as oxyhalides.

Nomenclature and formulas
The chemical formulas of the oxides of the chemical elements in their highest oxidation state are predictable and are derived from the number of valence electrons for that element. Even the chemical formula of O4, tetraoxygen, is predictable as a group 16 element. One exception is copper, for which the highest oxidation state oxide is copper(II) oxide and not copper(I) oxide. Another exception is fluoride, which does not exist as one might expect—as F2O7—but as OF2.

See also 

 Other oxygen ions ozonide, superoxide, peroxide,  and dioxygenyl, .
 Suboxide
 Oxohalide
 Oxyanion
 Complex oxide
 See :Category:Oxides for a list of oxides.
 Salt
 Wet electrons

References 

 
Anions